Jacques-François Lefranc (30 March 1739 - 2 September 1792) was a French cleric and anti-Masonic author.

Life
Lefranc was an Abbot at Caen's seminary of the Congregation of Jesus and Mary; he was opposed to Jansenism. After refusing to swear allegiance to the Constitution, he was replaced by François Bécherel; all Eudidists were then expelled from the seminary. Lefranc was subsequently arrested and imprisoned in the Carmelites prison in Paris. On 2 September 1792, he was murdered along with 180 other clerics. He has since been beatified by the Church.

His book, Le Voile levé pour les curieux, ou le Secret de la Révolution révélé, à l’aide de la Franc-Maçonnerie, published in 1791, advanced, for the first time, the thesis that a Masonic conspiracy was behind the French Revolution. He was a literary associate of Augustin Barruel.

Works

Original French
Le voile levé pour les curieux ou les secrets de la Révolution révelés à l'aide de la franc-maçonnerie, (Paris: Lepetit, 1791).
Conjuration contre la religion catholique et les souverains, dont le projet, conçu en France, doit s’exécuter dans l’univers entier, ouvrage utile à tous les Français (Paris: Lepetit, 1792)
L'Origine et la déclaration mystérieuse des francs-maçons (1793)
La symbolique maçonnique

English Translations
The Veil Lifted for the Curious, or the Secrets of the French Revolution with the Aid of Freemasonry (London: Spradabach, 2022).

References

1739 births
1792 deaths
People from Vire